Jung Da-yeon is a South Korean diet writer and fitness guru widely known as a Korean popular culture figure under the moniker "Auntie with a striking body".

Jung's popularity has since spread to other Asian regions. She has become a fitness phenomenon in Japan, following her appearance on NHK by the year 2004 and her books on diet have become bestsellers; her second book "Momjjang Diet Premium" sold 200,000 copies in just two weeks after publication in Japan. The success of her books was followed by Mom-chan Diet Wii Figureobics by Jung Da-Yeon, a fitness game released by Wii in December 2010.

Jung also starred in a series of television commercials for Hong Kong-based retail chain Mannings, in which she trains with an overweight cat mascot.

References

Living people
1966 births
South Korean writers
Exercise instructors
Diet food advocates